Kauraka Kauraka (5 September 1951 – 1997) was a Cook Islands writer.  He was born in Avatiu on Rarotonga, the main island of the Cooks, and educated at the University of the South Pacific in Suva, Fiji, and the University of Hawaiʻi at Mānoa. He published six collections of poems in the English and Rarotongan languages.  When Kauraka died in 1997, he was buried on the atoll of Manihiki, northern Cooks. He was the brother of artist and writer Tepaeru Tereora.

Bibliography 
 Taku Akatauira = My Dawning Star, IPS, USP, Suva, 1999.
 Manakonako :  Reflections, IPS, USP, 1992.
 E au tuatua Ta'ito no Manihiki, IPS, USP, Suva, 1987.
 Dreams of the Rainbow :  Moemoea a te Anuanua, Mana Publications, Suva, 1987.
 Return to Hawaiki, IPS, USP, Suva, 1980

References

External links 
Rainbow Women, in "Voyagers : A selection from Whetu Moana: Contemporary Polynesian Poems in English" (Auckland UP, 2003). Edited by Robert Sullivan, Albert Wendt and Reina Whaitiri 

1951 births
1997 deaths
Cook Island poets
People from Rarotonga
20th-century poets
20th-century New Zealand male writers
Cook Island writers
University of the South Pacific alumni
University of Hawaiʻi at Mānoa alumni